Cullaz is a surname. Notable people with the surname include:

 (1941-1998), French jazz bassist
 (1912-2000), French jazz critic
Pierre Cullaz (1935-2014), French jazz guitarist

Franco-Provençal-language surnames